Rest is an oil painting on fabric of 1879 by William-Adolphe Bouguereau in the Cleveland Museum of Art. It depicts a young mother with her children in the shade of a tree, with the dome of St Peter's Basilica in Rome in the background. The composition recalls  paintings of the Holy Family by Raphael. The work is signed at the bottom left.

The painting was bought from the artist by Hinman Hurlbut.

References

Paintings by William-Adolphe Bouguereau
1879 paintings
Paintings in the collection of the Cleveland Museum of Art